Cape Tuxen is a rocky cape forming the south side of the entrance to Waddington Bay on Kyiv Peninsula, the west coast of Graham Land. Discovered and named by the Belgian Antarctic Expedition, 1897–99, under Gerlache.

References
 SCAR Composite Gazetteer of Antarctica.

Headlands of Graham Land
Graham Coast